Celestus macrotus, La Selle galliwasp or Thomas's galliwasp, is a species of lizard of the Diploglossidae family. It is found in Haiti.

References

Celestus
Reptiles described in 1989
Reptiles of Haiti
Endemic fauna of Haiti
Taxa named by Stephen Blair Hedges